Robert F. Taylor (February 5, 1940 – June 4, 2006) was an American football player and coach. He served as the head football coach at his alma mater, the University of Maryland Eastern Shore, from 1969 to 1970, compiling a record of 2–15.

Taylor was selected by the New York Giants in the 1963 NFL Draft. He spent two seasons with the Giants before playing four more seasons in the Canadian Football League, first for the Winnipeg Blue Bombers (1965–1967) and then the Toronto Argonauts (1968).

Head coaching record

References

External links
 

1940 births
2006 deaths
American football defensive ends
American football defensive tackles
Maryland Eastern Shore Hawks football coaches
Maryland Eastern Shore Hawks football players
New York Giants players
Toronto Argonauts players
Winnipeg Blue Bombers players
People from Columbia, South Carolina
Coaches of American football from South Carolina
Players of American football from South Carolina